Alvarenga is a genus of robber flies in the family Asilidae. There are at least two described species in Alvarenga.

Species
These two species belong to the genus Alvarenga:
 Alvarenga icarius Carrera, 1960 c g
 Alvarenga matilei Papavero, 1971 c g
Data sources: i = ITIS, c = Catalogue of Life, g = GBIF, b = Bugguide.net

References

Further reading

External links

 
 

Asilidae genera